Caloranaerobacter azorensis  is a Gram-negative, thermophilic, anaerobic, chemoorganotrophic and motile bacterium from the genus of Caloranaerobacter which has been isolated from a deep-sea hydrothermal vent from the Lucky Strike hydrothermal vent site from the Mid-Atlantic Ridge.

References

Further reading 
 
 

Clostridiaceae
Bacteria described in 2001
Thermophiles